Cuautla may refer to:

Cuautla, Jalisco, Mexico
Cuautla, Morelos, Mexico
Cuautla FC, the football club of Cuautla, Morelos
Siege of Cuautla, 1812
Battle of Cuautla (1911)